Edmund Wilson House is a historic home located at Talcottville in Lewis County, New York. It was built over a four-year period starting in 1789 and is a -story limestone building, three bays wide and four bays long.  It was named "The Stone House" by Edmund Wilson, whose family used the house as a summer home and he made it famous in his book Upstate.

It was listed on the National Register of Historic Places in 1973.

References

Houses completed in 1789
Houses on the National Register of Historic Places in New York (state)
Georgian architecture in New York (state)
Houses in Lewis County, New York
1789 establishments in New York (state)
National Register of Historic Places in Lewis County, New York
Wilson, Edmund House